James Robert Claiborne (June 22, 1882 – February 16, 1944) was an American lawyer and politician from St. Louis, Missouri. He represented Missouri in the U.S. House from 1933 until 1937.

Claiborne was born in St. Louis, attended the public schools and was graduated from the law department of the University of Missouri at Columbia in 1907. He was admitted to the bar the same year and commenced practice in St. Louis. He lectured in the law school at St. Louis University for several years.

He was an unsuccessful candidate for judge of the circuit court of the eighth judicial district in 1924; elected as a Democrat to the Seventy-third and Seventy-fourth Congresses. He was an unsuccessful candidate for renomination in 1936; engaged in the practice of law in St. Louis until his death in 1944, and is buried in the Oak Grove Cemetery there.

External links

1882 births
1944 deaths
University of Missouri alumni
Politicians from St. Louis
Democratic Party members of the United States House of Representatives from Missouri
20th-century American politicians